John Cameron Semple (born 1947) is a botanist, cytotaxonomist, professor emeritus, and adjunct professor at the University of Waterloo in Ontario, Canada. He was born in Boston and earned a degree of Bachelor of Science in 1969 from Tufts University, followed in 1971 and 1972 by Master of Arts and Doctor of Philosophy degrees from Washington University in St. Louis. Semple is known for his work with members of the tribe Astereae, particularly goldenrods, American asters, and goldenasters, and he maintains the University of Waterloo Astereae Lab website. Semple's wife is Brenda, and in 2013, he named a newly-discovered goldenrod species Solidago brendiae in honor of her.

Early life and education
John Cameron Semple was born in 1947 in Boston, the second child of three to Bob Semple, an accountant, and Margaret Semple, a school teacher. As a child, John had an interest in art and took classes in the subject at a local museum. In high school, he became interested in biology, and this led him to enroll in Tufts University in 1965 to begin the study of medicine. At the encouragement of a botany professor he met at Tufts, he included courses in botany and taxonomy in his studies and decided to attend graduate school to become a botanist.

After earning a Bachelor of Science in 1969 from Tufts, Semple enrolled at Washington University in St. Louis, spending most of his time at the Missouri Botanical Garden. In 1971 and 1972, he earned Master of Arts and Doctor of Philosophy degrees in biology with a focus on botany. His 1972 PhD dissertation was entitled The Cytology, Flavonoid Chemistry and Systematics of the Texas Sleepy Daisy Xanthisma texanum DC. (Asteraceae). Semple acquired a background in cytotaxonomy and evolutionary classification while performing this research, as well as an affinity toward the study of flowering plants in the family Asteraceae.

Career
For post-doctoral studies, Semple remained at Washington University in St. Louis, also serving as a lecturer and visiting assistant professor, into the summer of 1974. Beginning that fall, he became a lecturer at the University of Waterloo, Ontario, Canada, where he spent his career and retired in 2012. One of Semple's early notable doctoral students was Canadian botanist Luc Brouillet.

The majority of Semple's post-retirement work has been focused on the goldenrod genus Solidago. In February 2021, he and botanist James B. Beck published a revision of the genus based on a large phylogenomic study. This revision can be viewed on Semple's website as well as in the original paper.

Awards
Semple received the COSEWIC Service Award from the Committee on the Status of Endangered Wildlife in Canada in 1998, and the John Goldie Award from the Field Botanists of Ontario in 2018.

Personal life
Semple and his wife Brenda have three sons and several grandchildren.

Selected publications
 Semple has published over 220 works including several new species. A sampling of his work is listed here in chronological order.

Citations

References

External links

1947 births
Living people
People from Boston
American botanical writers
20th-century American botanists
21st-century American botanists
Tufts University alumni
Washington University in St. Louis alumni
Academic staff of the University of Waterloo